Mordellistena amamiensis is a species of beetle in the genus Mordellistena of the family Mordellidae. It was discovered in 1956.

References

amamiensis
Beetles described in 1956